Héctor de Guevara (born 20 March 1940) is a Peruvian footballer. He competed in the men's tournament at the 1960 Summer Olympics. He was also part of Peru's squad for the 1963 South American Championship.

References

External links
 

1940 births
Living people
Peruvian footballers
Peru international footballers
Olympic footballers of Peru
Footballers at the 1960 Summer Olympics
People from Arequipa
Association football defenders
Sport Boys footballers
20th-century Peruvian people